The neighborhood of Faubourg Lafayette is a division in the city of New Orleans, Louisiana. It is also known as the 10th Ward of New Orleans, and it is one of the city's 17 wards. Faubourg Lafayette was founded with small settlements around steamboat landings in New Orleans. John Poultney acquired the property from Madame Rousseau on May 2, 1818 (with M. de Armas, Notary, officiating). The property was bounded by the lower line of property owned by Jacques François Enoul de Livaudais. This property ran through the squares between Soraparu and First streets at Tchoupitoulas Street. St. Andrew Street bounds the property below.

John Poultney caused a plan to be made by Joseph Pilie on March 2, 1824, by which he subdivided his plantation into lots and squares. The subdivision was named "Faubourg Lafayette," in honor of the Marquis de Lafayette, who visited New Orleans for four days in April 1825 during his triumphal tour of the United States, the country whose independence he had helped to win in his youth.

The faubourg became the City of Lafayette, then part of Jefferson Parish and its first parish seat. Lafayette was a separate municipality until it was incorporated into New Orleans, Orleans Parish, in 1852. The present boundaries include St. Charles Avenue, Jackson Avenue, the Pontchartrain Expressway, and Simon Bolivar Avenue. Jackson Avenue was once the heart of the city of Lafayette, along the old New Orleans and Carrollton Railroad line.

Closer to the river, the 10th Ward includes part of the lower Garden District. It is also the location of America's first experiment with public housing, which started in 1937 when the country was full of optimism with the start of the New Deal. President Roosevelt signed the loan for the construction to commence, of the Magnolia Housing Projects, the first authorized spending under the Housing Act of 1937, also known as the Wagner-Steagall Act.

Faubourg Lafayette is a neighborhood that is partly residential and partly commercial, with businesses such as Brown's Velvet Dairy. The main street is Oretha Castle Haley Boulevard, which is where most of the neighborhood's businesses are located.

History 
In 1718, the city of New Orleans, Louisiana (New France), was established. The original town was what is now called the French Quarter. New Orleans later expanded into additional neighborhoods, planning new streets and squares. Faubourg Lafayette was united by an act of legislation, prior to being classified as an official neighborhood. However, Faubourg Lafayette once belonged to another parish of Louisiana before it was annexed by New Orleans. This area was a municipality called Lafayette, the seat of Jefferson Parish from 1825 to 1852. Other neighborhoods such as Faubourg Nuns and Faubourg Delaissize were part of Lafayette for a time.

In 1818, Faubourg Lafayette was bought as a neighborhood and became a subdivision in 1824. In its newborn years as a city, it was cut into blocks and squares by John Poultney. Poultney acquired this neighborhood from Madame Rousseau, who like Samuel Herman bought his neighborhood from the heirs of Valery Delaissize. Both of these neighborhoods started as plantations, but the new owners decided to subdivide them in order to make more living space available for the growing population.

In 1796, Bertrand Gravier helped enlarge the Faubourg by including Phillipa St., which is now referred to as Poydras Street. Years later, Gravier died and Jean Gravier, his brother, was appointed to be the new owner of this estate. He continued in his brother's footsteps by further extending the Faubourg to Circus Street, which is currently known as Rampart Street. As Jean Gravier continued to expand the Faubourg, he allotted land near Poydras Street, approximately 40 feet in width, for a canal. This canal linked with an agency in Bayou St. John and flowed into an area called Hagan Avenue. The region which was the canal is now Jefferson Davis Parkway. In addition, Gravier designated a tract for a turning basin which linked to Canal Street. At that time the basin was an uninhabited district of land which was allocated for the community. Unsurprisingly, he later called the basin “Place Gravier.”

Jean Gravier didn't realize that the canal and “Place Gravier” would become the basis of dissension between the city of New Orleans and the New Orleans and Carrollton Railroad. At this time, the railroad company possessed the Canal, the Basin, and asserted ownership of segments of “Place Gravier.” The dispute between New Orleans and the railroad concluded when the Supreme Court of the Territory of Orleans announced a judgment in support of Jean Gravier, on May 23, 1805.

In 1841, the Supreme Court of Louisiana pronounced that the Canal and Basin were property of the railroad company. However, years later, in 1876, the Supreme Court altered their judgment and decided that the “Place Gravier” would be owned by New Orleans and as a location for the general public. This explains why in 1897, the city of New Orleans took legal action against Philip Werlein for possession of this basin. The location was declared to be public property as had been stated in the judgment of 1841. New Orleans won the lawsuit against Werlein and the Supreme Court of Louisiana. When the displeased Werlein decided that this verdict wasn't fair, he appealed the finding to the Supreme Court of the United States and they rendered a judgment in support of him. The U.S. Supreme Court reasoned that New Orleans had lost ownership of “Place Gravier.” So Philip Werlein was able to obtain possession of the disputed property, and this site is now occupied by the infamous Hotel de Soto.

Faubourg Lafayette is distinctive in its perimeters because of its unique history. Faubourg Lafayette lies in the upper section of New Orleans. The perimeters of Faubourg Lafayette are St. Charles Avenue, Calliope Street, Jackson Avenue, and Simon Bolivar Avenue. Today this area is known for its diverse mixture of businesses, homes, schools, and visitor attractions.

Geography
The Faubourg Lafayette location area coordinates are 29°56’30.053” North 90°04’ 41.109” West. The Elevation in the neighborhood ranged from 0 – 4 Feet. The area is approximately 0.264 square miles (0.684 square kilometers) and contains 61 city blocks. Faubourg Lafayette is located in the Central City district.

Boundaries 
Faubourg is a French word that stands for suburb, which is a smaller area outside of a larger city.

Due to the fact that Faubourg Lafayette is not officially recognized by the state of Louisiana, the boundaries of the area are very roughly defined. The City of New Orleans website contains no information about the neighborhood but does have a tab ready for information to be input.

According to the official historic neighborhood association website for Faubourg Lafayette, “No one has drawn the neighborhood map yet.” However, the website does provide a map for the general area. Although many of the Louisiana and New Orleans websites do not have any information on the boundaries of Faubourg Lafayette, Google.com/Maps does.  It recognizes the borders as Simon Bolivar Avenue to Jackson Avenue and St. Charles Avenue to Calliope Street.

The land for the neighborhood was first acquired on May 2, 1818. It bordered the Mississippi River at Tchoupitoulas Street and ran north between 1st Street and Soraparu Street. This area is located to the southwest of the current faubourg and is located in a neighborhood called the Irish Channel.

Adjacent neighborhoods 

Broadmoor, New Orleans (northwest) 
Milan, New Orleans (west) 
Garden District, New Orleans (southwest) 
Lower Garden District (south) 
Central Business District, New Orleans (east) 
Gert Town, New Orleans (north)

Demographics 
The census tract border 134 for the American community Survey 2012 has slightly larger borders however it is generally the same area.  The borders are from Felicity Street to Prytania Street, Thalia Street to magazine Street, Calliope Street to south Rampart Street, and Thalia Street to Oretha Haley Boulevard. Also, the census for 1990 and 2000 have the same borders but have been split down the middle at Thalia Street. The two sections are defined as census tract 67 and 79. When looking at the data for those time periods we simply added the data for the two tracts together so they could be comparable to the 2012 data.

The census of 2012 average median household income was 29,229.The total population was approximately 1,352 and the percent of the population 65 and older was 11.4%. The percent of the population in the labor force was 76.3%.

The census of 2000 average median household income was 28,551 (price in 2012 dollar appreciation). The total population was approximately 1,490 and the percent of the population 65 and older was 22.35%. The percent of the population in the labor force was 49.35%.

The census of 1990 average median household income was 30,917 (price in 2012 dollar appreciation). The total population was approximately 1,520 and the percent of the population 65 and older was 23.4%. The percent of the population in the labor force was 39.35%.

Landmarks
There are many special landmarks in this neighborhood. This neighborhood is situated close to The Garden District, New Orleans, where there are many celebrity residences. Oretha Castle Haley is the main street that runs through the neighborhood of Faubourg Lafayette and holds many of the neighborhood's attractions. There are many more buildings with significant purposes and historical background. A Catholic church sits on Oretha Castle Haley Blvd; this church is St. John the Baptist Catholic Church. There is also a community center situated on Clio St., which is very close to the church. This community center is used as an after school care for many young children and as a recreational center that stimulates children and young adults so that they do not get into any trouble in the neighborhood. Also, inside this community center is a head start program for small children while their parents are at work, or on tour in the city. In addition, Brown's Velvet Dairy which is where the dairy is made for much of the city. Brown's Dairy is a very big tourist attraction for the city because this is the dairy factory for the city. Many tourists are astounded by the fact that the dairy products for the New Orleans area comes locally. Also in this area is a cultural arts center known as the Ashe' Cultural Arts Center. In this center, many plays and cultural events happen in this center. In this cultural center, there are ways that the facilities may be rented by outside proprietors, such as schools, churches, and other community centers. The calendar of the events for this community center is posted on the website for the cultural arts center. There is also a summer program at the Ashe’ Cultural Arts Center in Faubourg Lafayette for children ages 6–16. The program's mission is to promote the cultural arts through teaching the children yoga, visual arts, dance, martial arts, stepping, and voice. They also provide the children with breakfast, lunch, and a snack daily. The prices for this tuition are posted on the cultural center website. Other landmarks in the area are various cafes and restaurants. One specific café in the area is Cafe Reconcile. This nonprofit café provides training and lifelong skills to youth that are “at-risk.” They have set up a program for these youth and since the time that they opened; more than 1,000 youth have successfully completed the program. Many could argue that this is a culinary school for these at risk youth because many of the youth that have completed this course and went into the culinary business in New Orleans. It is located in Oretha Castle Haley Blvd. There is also a homeless shelter located in the neighborhood. It is called The New Orleans Mission Homeless Shelter, located on Baronne St. It is dedicated to serve the homeless people of the Tenth Ward area so that they may have a dry place to stay on any given night and a hot meal on any given day. The shelter also holds many different fundraising opportunities for the shelter and hosts many social events. Oretha Castle Haley Blvd. also houses the New Orleans Jazz Market. This is a place a place that jazz bands have been able to perform. Other landmarks that have taken form recently in Faubourg Lafayette are the Southern Food and Beverage Museum, also known as SoFAB. These museums are taking up shop on O.C. Haley Blvd. The Southern Food and Beverage Museum will now be moved to the building that was formally the Dryades Market. Many more landmarks are in this general area in the New Orleans area.

Schools/education 
This neighborhood of Faubourg Lafayette is also known for its vast assortment of educational advancements in their district. The New Orleans Cooking Experience is located on 1519 Carondelet Street. This institution specializes in culinary training and has excellent reviews despite the complaints about expensive tuition. The Myrtle Rosebella Banks School is located 1307 Oretha Castle Haley Blvd. near Martin Luther King Blvd. This is a public school that is a part of Orleans Parish. Myrtle Rosebella Banks School educates youth beginning at Pre-Kindergarten all the way to sixth grade. Another public school in this area is James M. Singleton Charter School. This school is small in size, but its academic statistics are notable.

The International High School of New Orleans is located 1400 Camp St., in New Orleans, LA. This institution is highly recognized and acknowledged in the neighborhood Faubourg Lafayette and the state of Louisiana. The International High School of New Orleans is also a Charter School, and has open enrollment for all Louisiana residents entering grades nine through twelfth grade. Due to such outstanding academic statistics, this school's general admission is based on a “first-come, first-served basis to students”.

Located on 1522 Chippewa St. in New Orleans is the St. Michael Special School. This institution is small in capacity, but takes on a task that oversees most larger educational institutions do not. This school “is designed to help students with major learning difficulties that hinder their ability to achieve success in a regular class setting”. This school does this by acknowledging students Catholic beliefs in their curriculum. While implementing vocational and physical training, the educators patiently motivate and push their students academically and socially. Unlike most public institutions, this school has a very wide age range of students ranging from 6-15 for the Elementary Department, 16-21 for the Vocational Training Department, and the Joy Center accepts adults 22 and older to participate in this learning facility.

Not too far from the St. Michael Special School is the Tulane School of Public Health and Tropical Medicine. This college offers several academic programs that “provide a comprehensive, practice-based, global health-focused education at both the undergraduate and graduate level”. In addition, this institution offers degrees in six academic departments and is “accredited by the Council on Education for Public Health”. The post-graduate employment rate at the Tulane School of Public Health and Tropical Medicine is 90% or better. This indicates how successful this school is in preparing their students for life after college.

Recent developments 
The most significant development in recent years to the Faubourg Lafayette is the demolition of the St. Thomas Development. This was very important to the city because there were many citizens that lived in this housing development and when it was torn down, after Hurricane Katrina, many residents lost their homes and had to turn to the New Orleans Mission Homeless Shelter. This development housed only white residents until the 1960s due to segregation laws, and after the desegregation of the housing project, it became one of the country's most dangerous housing projects. St. Thomas Projects had become predominately African American by the end of the 1980s and remained that way until it had been torn down. The City of New Orleans was given a grant to demolish the site and rebuild, along with this grant was funding to help over 3,000 families to relocate to different areas during this time period. The idea of this was to create a mixed income neighborhood so the crime rate would decrease. As time progressed, there was rental property built on the property.

Other notable and recent developments include the New Orleans Jazz Museum taking residence on Oretha Castle Haley Blvd, the neighborhood's most notable and main strip. The New Orleans Jazz Market, which is the home of the new Jazz Orchestra, will be moved to the vacant Gator's Department Store spot. This new and improved space will include jazz archives and a “walk of fame.” Also, due to recent updates on the neighborhood website, the citizens are attempting to beautify the area. There is a blight and beautification committee dedicated to doing just that.  The blight and beautification volunteers are in charge of making sure that there are no poisonous weeds or other plant life to the neighborhood. In addition, they are in charge of beautifying a specific part of the neighborhood, whether that means to plant trees or pick up garbage off the streets.

There is also a publication of a monthly newsletter telling of the upcoming events for any specific month. This is especially helpful for freshman seminar classes that are looking for a community service project or a community service project in general. Developments along O.C. Haley include the new arrival of the SoFAB Museum, also known as the Southern Food and Beverage Museum. The museum will be settled in the building that used to be the Dryades Market. This museum will include culinary culture and history. Also, in this museum, there will be The Museum of the American Cocktail detailing the history of certain cocktails throughout American history. In addition, there will be a Gallery of the States. The Gallery of States would include an exhibit outlining cuisine from the other Southern states and The District of Columbia. There will be an adjacent building to the museum holding many galleries, offices, a rooftop garden, and a children's gallery. More information about the building and planning of the Southern Food and Beverage Museum will be published on Facebook and Twitter. These recent developments have really altered the way the neighborhood is perceived because the public perception of the Tenth Ward had long been a bad one, and now, citizens are willing to visit the neighborhood and participate in the many activities that are held there. The St. Thomas Development is no longer in the Faubourg Lafayette neighborhood, but there is rental property set in this area.

Politics 
The city of New Orleans and the parish of Orleans operate as a merged city-parish government. Before the city of New Orleans became co-extensive with Orleans Parish (or before it annexed towns from what used to be Jefferson Parish), the area was home to numerous smaller communities. The original city of New Orleans was composed of what are now the 1st through 9th wards. The city of Lafayette (including the Garden District) was added in 1852 as the 10th and 11th wards. Because the neighborhood of New Orleans is located within the city of New Orleans, it has a mayor-council government. This means that there is a city council consisting of seven council members, elected by the district and two at-large council members.

Currently the mayor of New Orleans is Mayor Mitchell J. Landrieu who was elected February 6, 2010. Mary Landrieu is a United States Senator. She was elected to the House of Representatives in 1979. She served from 1980 to 1988 and represented a New Orleans district. Landrieu was re-elected to the 90th district in October 1983 with a 78% vote. Landrieu was elected in 1996 to the United States Senate seat after defeating Louisiana State Representative Woody Jenkins of Baton Rouge in the general election.

New Orleans and Faubourg Lafayette fall under the 2nd congressional district; therefore Cedric Richmond represents it. He is a member of the Democratic Party and has been a U.S. Representative for Louisiana's 2nd congressional district since 2011.

Karen Carter Peterson is the present State Senator for Louisiana. She has been a democratic member of the Louisiana State Senate, and has represented Louisiana since 2010. Currently she is Chairperson of the Louisiana Democratic Party. She is also the first female to serves as chair of Louisiana's Democratic Party, and since 2008 she has served as Democratic National Committeewomen of Louisiana. Prior to serving as the State Senator, she served in the Louisiana House of Representatives.
State Representatives Walt Leger, Neil Abramson, and Helena Moreno serve as the State Representatives who represent districts 91, 98, and 93. LaToya Cantrell serves on district B city council, whereas, Jacquelyn Brechtel Clarkson and Stacy Head serves as the council members at large.

Faubourg Lafayette is located in Orleans Parish; therefore the Orleans Parish Jail is used where inmates are housed. The jail is located at 531 South Broad Street; it is operated by the Orleans Parish Sheriff's Office. The City of New Orleans pays the Orleans Parish Sheriff per-prisoner and per-day to house inmates. As of May 2013, Orleans Parish Prison was ranked as one of the worst prisons in the country according to Mother Jones magazine.

The Sheriff for the Parish of Orleans is Sheriff Marlin Gusman, who has been twice elected. He is responsible for the care, custody and control of inmates at this particular correctional facility in the United States. He is also the Executive Officer for the Criminal and Civil Courts in New Orleans, where is responsible for the service of subpoenas, courtroom security, and the executor process. He also provides security for the Criminal District Court, and provides backup for the New Orleans Police Department on an as-needed basis.

The Orleans Parish Civil Sheriff's Office serves papers involving lawsuits and provides security for the Civil District Court and Juvenile Courts.

See also
Central City, New Orleans
Lafayette Square
List of streets of New Orleans
Neighborhoods in New Orleans
Uptown New Orleans#City of Lafayette

References 

Neighborhoods in New Orleans
Wards of New Orleans